, often shortened to just , is a Japanese baseball-themed manga series written and illustrated by Asa Higuchi. It has been serialized in Kodansha's seinen manga magazine Monthly Afternoon since September 2003, with its chapters collected in 36 tankōbon volumes as of December 2022.

It was adapted into an anime television series, directed by Tsutomu Mizushima and animated by A-1 Pictures, which aired for 25 episodes on TBS from April to September 2007. A 13-episode second season was broadcast from April to June 2010. In North America, the first season was licensed by Funimation, while the second season was licensed by Right Stuf.

By November 2019, the manga had over 15 million copies in circulation. It won the Tezuka Osamu Cultural Prize for best creative work in 2006 and the Kodansha Manga Award for general manga in 2007. The anime series has been overall well received by critics, who have praised its story and characters, and particularly its focus on strategy and teamwork. The series, however, has received somewhat mixed response due to its pacing.

Story
The series, set in Saitama Prefecture, follows the story of Ren Mihashi. Mihashi was the previous ace pitcher in his middle school's baseball team, but it seems that he only got the position because his grandfather was the owner of the school. His teammates (especially the team's catcher, Hatake) hated him, and they always lost their games. Mihashi is thoroughly convinced that he is a lousy baseball pitcher, and feels guilty because he believes that he is responsible for all the losses. Mihashi graduates through middle school with extremely low self-esteem. But in truth Mihashi is really a hardworking and skillful pitcher, and the main reason why his team always lost all the games is because of bad cooperation,  because his teammates never talked about the game with him, and they did not try to come up with a plan or strategy to fight against their rivals. Mihashi then transfers to Nishiura High School with plans of quitting baseball because he thinks he is not good enough to succeed at it, though he still loves the game deeply. However, he is dragged into Nishiura's baseball team by their coach, Momoe, while watching the team training outside the field. Assisted by his new teammates (and especially the catcher, Takaya Abe), he grows in stature, confidence and skill, helping his team excel with his own abilities.

Characters

Nishiura Baseball Team

Mihashi is the team's pitcher. His nervousness and extreme lack of self-confidence is at odds with his skill, a result of his passion for and dedication to pitching. Mihashi was ostracized by his middle school teammates, who believed he had been given his position of ace because his grandfather owns the school. During the time period, the catcher and team refused to cooperate during games, causing them to lose every game. Mihashi transfers to Nishiura High School afterward, where he joins their baseball team, though fears he will cause more losses. As the series progresses, Mihashi slowly gains more confidence in himself and trust in the team, especially the catcher, Abe. Despite this, Mihashi retains his skittish and shy personality. He shows to have cynophobia.

Abe is the catcher in the Nishiura High School baseball team. As such, he forms the team's battery along with Mihashi. Abe is a serious and mature character, whose short temper is often inadvertently provoked by Mihashi. He is very strategically minded and initially values Mihashi for his obedience in team games. Abe is a capable catcher, signaling Mihashi the right pitches after thoroughly examining his opponent. As the catcher, he successfully memorizes the quirks of the batter and what pitches they are weak against. As time progresses, Abe strives to win games to improve Mihashi's self-confidence. He often gets partially jealous toward Mihashi. Abe normally does not show his emotions to everyone, including Mihashi and the rest of the team. He has a tendency to nag and yell constantly and sometimes acting violent, but later on he is more and more caring and open to Mihashi's feelings.

The cleanup hitter of the team. He is outgoing, confident, friendly, and extremely perverted, but also very talented at baseball. He is considered to be number 1 in his baseball team. However, because of his small build, he is unable to hit home runs, and relies on the team to complete runs. Tajima and Mihashi develop a friendship, and he is able to understand and elucidate Mihashi's sometimes incomprehensible attempts at communication to others. Many have commented that he acts as Mihashi's older brother. Tajima enjoys catching fast balls and, as a result, becomes a back-up catcher in case of Abe's absence and for training purposes.

Azusa bats fifth for the team who batted cleanup in middle school. While originally presented as a hot-headed and rude character, he is later shown to be a relatively smart and observant person, and is unanimously voted to become team captain. He tries to surpass Tajima and compete with him, but decides that he must work for the good of the team, rather than taking risks to prove himself.

He usually bats in the second position. Sakaeguchi is very friendly and familiar with Abe from their attendance at the same middle school. When Abe and Mihashi have trouble understanding each other, Sakaeguchi generally attempts to mediate, being able to understand both of their mannerisms. Under stress, Sakaeguchi is known to get diarrhea, a trait revealed by Abe, who noticed it during their high school entrance exams. Sakaeguchi is closest to Suyama on the team, because they are in the same class. Unlike other members of the team, Sakaeguchi's mother is deceased.

One of the more experienced characters on the team, shown to be good at batting, catching, and to be a fast base runner. He is in the same class as Mihashi and Tajima and is revealed to share their lunchtime activities of talking, eating, and then falling asleep. Izumi attended the same elementary and junior high school as Hamada, although up until high school Hamada was a year above him. He appears to enjoy antagonizing Hamada and does not treat him with the respect due to a former senior schoolmate. Due to his more serious personality, Izumi tends to get annoyed quickly, especially at Abe's constant bickering.

The shortstop and third baseman of the team. A level-headed character, he is generally quieter and less rambunctious than his teammates, although he once reacts strongly to Momoe's offer of a particular brand of protein powder to which he harbors a strong dislike. It's revealed that Suyama does not share many of the boyish qualities the other Nishiura boys seem to have, such as fantasizing girls, emphasizing his more mature personality. In the series, he is closest to Sakaeguchi.

He is less skilled at baseball than some of the other members, and occasionally fumbles catches. This leads to Abe calling him the "Crap Left". Many of Mizutani's hits at bat are entirely based on luck; he admits that he does not have a good eye for the ball. He appears to be the most simple-minded of the Nishiura team, often sharing the same goofiness as Mihashi. Mizutani appears to enjoy listening to music, as he is almost always seen with headphones on outside of practice.

Nishiura's reserve pitcher and first baseman. He is a very shy and nervous character who rarely speaks his mind because he is afraid that he might be scolded by the others. He has more pitching experience than Hanai, but was reluctant to admit it as he did not want to pitch in official games. However, he is inspired by Mihashi's dedication and decides to try his best for the team.

Nishiura's reserve player and is often seen sitting in the benches cheering his team on. Nishihiro is always the base coach next to third base when Nishiura is on the offense. He is a beginner at baseball and therefore has little experience playing. When he does play in games, he often plays the position of left fielder. He is supposedly one of the smartest first years at school because he never has to study for tests.

Associated members

The head coach of the baseball team, and the most prominent adult character in the series. At the start of the series, she mentions that she is a graduate of Nishiura, which used to offer softball instead of baseball. The team nicknames her "Momokan", short for "Momoe-kantoku" (Coach Momoe), and develop a respect for her, though often find her intimidating. She is also very attractive described by most of the baseball team. Momoe is physically strong and is very dedicated to the baseball team, working menial side jobs to help pay for equipment. Though several characters comment on the peculiarity of having a female coach for a baseball team, Momoe is shown to be competent in the role. Momoe has a small dog named Ai who accompanies the team to practice, including practice games with other teams.

The manager, a position equivalent to a secretary, of the baseball team. A very hardworking and earnest character, she has great pride in the baseball team and takes great strides in helping them, from making rice balls to writing detailed reports about opposing teams. As manager, she has memorized much information about her own team, and knows all of their full names and birthdays. She stated that she has no romantic interest in anyone on the team, but it is later revealed that she has feelings for Abe, though she will not act upon them to avoid awkwardness in the team. She went to the same middle school as Abe and Sakaeguchi, where she played softball in the position of shortstop. Chiyo also loves trying on other school's uniforms, and often swaps uniforms with her friends and takes pictures.

The teacher advisor responsible for the baseball team. Though he is a math teacher, Shiga-sensei appears to have a great deal of knowledge about the body and how it works, although he does not know much about baseball. His relaxing and concentrating methods of meditation help Mihashi and the others to mentally grow as a team.

A childhood friend of Mihashi. Though they used to play baseball together when they were young, Hamada has quit playing for an unknown reason, supposedly because of “Little League elbow”, which refers to an elbow injury caused by pitching too much when he was younger. Hamada founded the baseball team's cheering squad and is very good at sewing. Mihashi calls him by his childhood nickname, Hama-chan, which has been adopted by other members of the baseball team. He attended the same elementary school and junior high as Izumi, and the two appear to be very familiar with each other, though Izumi shows him no respect despite Hamada being a year older. Hamada was held back a year due to missing school because he had to work part-time to earn money. He lives by himself as his family has moved to find jobs elsewhere and has a reputation among the girls in his class, but this seems to be just rumor.
   
 (Umehara)
 (Kajiyama)
Two of Hamada's friends and former classmates who agree to join the baseball teams cheering squad.

Opposition
Teams
Several opposing teams are introduced in Big Windup!. Mihoshi Academy's team is a prominent subject, as Mihashi had left them after his three years as ace pitcher. Along with the battery Kanou and Hatake, the team has Hiroyuki Oda, a cleanup hitter who speaks in a Kansai dialect in Japanese, and the American equivalent southern accent in English. Musashino First is the team where Haruna resides as ace pitcher. Originally lazy and laid-back, the team is later stirred into action by Haruna's desire to end the team's mediocrity. Along with Haruna, the team includes Naoto Kaguyama, the starting pitcher, Ohkawa, the team captain, and Kyouhei Akimaru, a kind back-up pitcher for Haruna. Suzune Miyashita is the team's manager who is dating Ohkawa. Tosei High School was the previous year's Koshien winner, who underestimated the skill of Nishiura. Junta Takase is the Tosei's ace pitcher, who uses sinkers and forkballs to strike out batters, while Kazuki Kawai is the team captain.

Mihashi's former teammate who took the role of starting pitcher after Mihashi left and uses a forkball as a strikeout pitch. His team had said that he would have been the ace pitcher of the team if Mihashi's grandfather, who owned the school, had not made Mihashi the starting pitcher. However, Kanou refuses to accept the notion, seeing Mihashi's true potential as an ace pitcher and angry at how the team treated him. As such, he is the first of his team to play seriously against Nishiura in a practice game until convincing the others to as well. Kanou and Mihashi were friends during childhood and Mihashi occasionally refers to him by the nickname "Shu-chan". In fact, at the last episode of season one, Kanou smiles upon hearing this and says excitedly, "He's calling me by my first name! It's like we're little kids again!".
 

The catcher for the Mihoshi team. He was the most opposed to Mihashi being their ace pitcher in middle school, believing that Kanou was a better pitcher and deserved the position more. Hatake goes as far as to threaten to break Mihashi's arm, even after he had left and joined Nishiura, but is later convinced by Kanou to take him seriously. Hatake and the rest of the team makes amends after losing to Mihashi and his teammates, though Hatake still stubbornly declares Kanou the better pitcher.

Musashino's back-up pitcher and a former teammate of Abe, whose goal is to become a professional baseball player. At first, he refused Abe to be his catcher because of Abe's short height and doubted his ability as a catcher. Though they grow closer, Abe begins to dislike Haruna's principles about pitching; he refuses to throw more than 80 pitches and use his full strength, while also being protective of his throwing arm, and was unwilling to throw a slider due to a mosquito bite. Haruna's current catcher, Akimaru, noted that Haruna seemed more aggravated and wild in his middle school years, and expressed an understanding for Abe's feelings. On the Musashino team, Haruna is shown to be very hard-working and instills determination into the team, particularly Naoto Kaguyama, who would have quit without Haruna's interference.

Other characters

The cousin of Ren Mihashi. When they were young, Mihashi and his family visited Ruri and they often played together with Kanou, leading him and Mihashi to develop a friendship. During his middle school games, he told Ruri to not attend and thus did not tell her when the games took place, embarrassed and ashamed for his failures. She cheered for Nishiura during their game against Tosei, surprised by how Mihashi had skillfully played during the game. Ruri enjoys calling Mihashi by the nickname Renren, much to his dismay. Mihashi's teammates even teased him upon hearing Ruri call him by that nickname. She has a younger brother named Ryuu.

Development
While growing up in Saitama, Asa Higuchi became familiar with baseball by reading the manga Dokaben. When she was in high school, the story of a local baseball team wound up inspiring her to come up with the idea for her own baseball manga. In the original version, Mihashi never spoke and characters like Momoe, Kanou and Haruna did not exist yet. Following that, she collected data on high school baseball for over 10 years in order to create the manga, and she worked with the school she had attended, Urawanishi High School, in the year prior to the serialization.

Five months prior to the serialization in Monthly Afternoon, Higuchi published a one shot in the magazine titled "The Basic of Basics". The story was centered around the characters of the Musashino Dai Ichi school, who would show up in the series itself.

Media

Manga

Written and illustrated by Asa Higuchi, Big Windup! started in Kodansha's seinen manga magazine Monthly Afternoon on September 25, 2003. Kodansha has collected its chapters into individual tankōbon volumes. The first volume was released on March 20, 2004. As of December 22, 2022, thirty-six volumes have been released.

Anime

An anime television series adaptation was produced by Aniplex, TBS, Kodansha, Movic, MBS, and A-1 Pictures. It was directed by Tsutomu Mizushima, with Yōsuke Kuroda handling series composition, Takahiko Yoshida designing the characters and Shirō Hamaguchi composing the music. It ran for 25 episodes and was broadcast in Japan on TBS from April 12 to September 28, 2007. It was followed by a second season, titled , which ran for 13 episodes from April 1 to June 24, 2010.

The series was licensed in North America by Funimation in 2008. Lance Heiskell, marketing director of Funimation, announced in January 2010 that the company had no plans to release the second season of the anime adaptation. The series made its North American television debut on March 14, 2011 on the Funimation Channel. The second season has been licensed by Right Stuf Inc.

Video game
A video game adaptation of the series was released on the Nintendo DS by MMV. It was released December 13, 2007.

Reception

Manga
In 2007, Big Windup! won the Kodansha Manga Award for general manga. Big Windup! was the 41st best selling manga in 2011, with over 1.09 million copies sold. Nikkei Entertainment magazine published a list of top 50 manga creators by sales since January 2010, in its September 2011 issue; Asa Higuchi, the author of Big Windup! was ranked 30th, with over 2.24 million copies sold. By November 2019, the manga had over 15 million copies in circulation.

Anime
In his review of the first seven episodes, Carl Kimlinger of Anime News Network (ANN) gave the series a B+. Kimlinger praised it for its focus on "strategy and the technicalities of team play, not on skills and thrills", commending as well its writing, direction, scoring and casting, adding that "they all come seamlessly together to tell a simple story (a group of guys, a baseball diamond, and a game they really want to win) with sly suspense and unexpected complexity." In another review for the second season, Kimlinger also called it "a quiet kind of series, with a quiet kind of charm", adding: "It's all such easygoing, perfectly balanced fun that the fierce anticipation you feel at episode's end, with its promises of a new match, comes as a bit of a shock. Rarely has baseball been such a blast, and such a laid-back one."

Justin Sevakis of ANN also made positive comments about the series; however, he stated that the second half of the first season, "while still fun and watchable, falls down rather badly", adding that it "comes down with a serious case of Shonen Tournament Syndrome", criticizing its slow pacing. Despite this, Sevakis said that the series is "surprisingly involving", and called it "most compelling sports anime since Hajime no Ippo," concluding: "For all its faults, Big Windup! is still a must-watch." Bamboo Dong of the same website praised the series as well, calling it one of the best baseball-centric shows, commending the focus on teamwork, friendship, and its examination of the human side of the sport. Dong, however, noted the slow pacing of the show, stating: "if you're expecting a steady stream of games, with all the action stacked towards winning or losing, you won't find that in this series." Dong, nevertheless, ultimately called it "one of the finest baseball anime out there, and seriously underrated."

James Brusuelas from Animation World Network praised the series for its detailed focus on baseball, recommending it to fans of the sport. He stated, however, that like the sport, the series "can move very slowly." Brusuelas concluded that the series "gets points for just being itself", noting that, while most anime licensed in the US are about "supernatural high school students," "it's always nice to see the other side of anime that is so prevalent in Japan, that is, its reflection of the contemporary world." In a review of the first half of the first season, Holly Ellingwood of Active Anime lauded the series for its characters and story, noting that "it has its ample share of sports action and drama, but it also has a lot of fun with a perky sense of humor." Ellingwood also praised the animation, stating that "[t]he details of the baseball mound and sequences during the game are exciting every time," concluding: "It's a baseball series that hits it out of the park every time!" Reviewing the second half of the first season, Ellingwood wrote: "The anime remains a lot of fun and with its amiable tone and good intentions, it's impossible to not smile while watching it. Definitely one of the feel good anime series of the year. If you enjoy shows such as Prince of Tennis then this is the anime for you."

Brad Rice of Japanator praised the series, stating that it "sticks true to its seinen roots and tackles baseball in a straightforward, almost analytical route." Rice added that the series "spends a lot of time on the strategy of baseball, with players trying to out-think each other, a la Death Note. Except without the intense music." Rice also praised its visuals and the Japanese voice acting, concluding: "Even if you're not big into sports, Big Windup will make you think about digging your glove out of the shed." The website also ranked the series #47 on their "Top 50 Anime of the Decade" list, stating: "Big Windup manages to do what so many anime and manga try to do: take a subject that seems off-putting or complicated, and break it down within a narrative that you can really get behind."

In a more negative review, John Sinnott of DVD Talk criticized the series, mainly for its protagonist, Mihashi, expressing that "the irritating main character makes this show a lot less enjoyable that it could have been." Sinnoot commented that the series has good aspects such as "the drama of baseball, the tension between the catcher and the pitch, and getting the disparate members coming together to form a team", but that "the few flaws really drag the series down." He concluded: "There are some great  anime, but this isn't one of them."

Notes

References

External links
  
  
  
  
 
  

2007 anime television series debuts
2010 anime television series debuts
A-1 Pictures
Aniplex
Baseball in anime and manga
Funimation
High school baseball in Japan
Kodansha manga
Mainichi Broadcasting System original programming
Nintendo DS games
Seinen manga
Television shows written by Yōsuke Kuroda
TBS Television (Japan) original programming
Winner of Kodansha Manga Award (General)
Winner of Tezuka Osamu Cultural Prize (Creative Award)